Brandon Hamilton (born March 5, 1972 in Baton Rouge, Louisiana) is a former cornerback who played ten seasons in the Canadian Football League.

1972 births
Living people
American players of Canadian football
BC Lions players
Canadian football defensive backs
Edmonton Elks players
Hamilton Tiger-Cats players
Sportspeople from Baton Rouge, Louisiana
Shreveport Pirates players
Tulane Green Wave football players
Winnipeg Blue Bombers players